Cedric Cobbs (born January 9, 1981) is a former American football running back who played for two seasons in the National Football League (NFL) and one season in the af2. He was drafted by the New England Patriots in the fourth round of the 2004 NFL draft and played one season with the team. He played for the Denver Broncos in 2006 and for the Arkansas Twisters in 2008.

College career
Cobbs attended college at the University of Arkansas, where he played football, starting for five years, suffering a season ending injury early in the 2000 season, and taking a medical redshirt. He finished his collegiate football career with 3,018 rushing yards, good enough for fifth place in school history. Cobbs led the Razorbacks to a 9-4 mark his redshirt senior year in 2003, and was named 1st team Southeastern Conference, after rushing for 1,320 yards and 10 touchdowns. Cobbs was also named the Offensive MVP of the 2003 Independence Bowl, leading Arkansas to a 27-14 victory over the Missouri Tigers, rushing 27 times for 141 yards and one touchdown. During his freshman season in 1999, Cobbs set the freshman rushing record at Arkansas (668 yards), but it has since been broken by former Razorback running back Darren McFadden. Cobbs was named to the SEC All-Freshman team in 1999, and led Arkansas to a 27-06 victory over the Texas Longhorns in the 2000 Cotton Bowl on New Year's Day in Dallas, Texas, winning the Offensive MVP honor for the game after scoring touchdowns rushing and receiving.

Professional career

National Football League
Cobbs was drafted in the fourth round (128th overall) of the 2004 NFL Draft by the New England Patriots. After helping the Patriots win Super Bowl XXXIX as a rookie, he was released during final roster cuts on August 29, 2005. He was acquired by the Denver Broncos in 2006, via free agency. He played in two games and gained nine yards on three rushing attempts. He was released by the Broncos on May 1, 2007, but re-signed on August 21. He was released in the first round of roster cuts six days later.

Cobbs appeared on the NFL radar again in March 2008, when he attended the largest NFL Pro Day in Arkansas football history.  Cobbs worked out with the running backs in front of 45 NFL team officials.  Cobbs was unable to make an NFL team for the 2008 season.  He also attended the 2009 Pro Day at the University, joining former Razorback wide receiver Marcus Monk in attempting to make an NFL roster.

af2
Cobbs was activated, and made his arena football debut against the Iowa Barnstormers on June 28, 2008.

Boxing career
Cobbs took part in a professional boxing match at Bumpus Harley Davidson in Memphis, Tennessee. The match, which was the main event, was part of a charity event for an "Anti-Bullying Campaign." Cobbs' opponent was local boxer Sugi Foxx; he entered the night with an 0-9 record. According to Boxrec.com Cobbs was TKO'd in the second round of a scheduled four round bout.

Arrest Record
Cedric Cobbs and another man attempted to obtain drugs by passing a forged prescription from Dr. Columbus Brown IV for 180 Roxicodones, the release states. Bryant Police spokesman Sgt. Todd Crowson said an employee noticed an irregularity in the prescription itself and called police.
When police arrived, Cobbs and Hunt were seen getting into their vehicle and fleeing, according to the report. Authorities stopped the vehicle around Springhill Crossing off Arkansas 5. Cobbs, who is identified in the release as the driver of the vehicle, was arrested and charged with conspiracy to obtain drugs by fraud, fleeing and driving on a suspended driver’s license, the release states.

On July 17, 2015, Cedric Cobbs was booked into Pulaski County Jail on a first degree charge of promoting prostitution.  Records show Cobbs drove a woman to an Americas Best Value Inn & Suites at 14325 Frontier Drive in Maumelle, where she had arranged with a person who was actually an undercover police officer "to have sex for money." Cobbs reportedly waited in the parking lot and was arrested.

The report noted police found a pipe used to smoke methamphetamine in the vehicle's center console as well as a second pipe, prescription pills and meth in the woman's purse.

References

 http://www.arkansasonline.com/news/2013/sep/17/former-hog-cedric-cobbs-arrested-bryant/

1981 births
Living people
Sportspeople from Little Rock, Arkansas
American football running backs
Arkansas Razorbacks football players
New England Patriots players
Denver Broncos players
Players of American football from Arkansas